Piazzolo is a comune (municipality) in the Province of Bergamo in the Italian region of Lombardy, located about  northeast of Milan and about  north of Bergamo.

Piazzolo borders the following municipalities: Mezzoldo, Moio de' Calvi, Olmo al Brembo, Piazza Brembana, Piazzatorre, Valnegra.

In the cemetery is buried Guido Galli an Italian judge killed by the Red Brigades in the 1980s.

Demographic evolution

References